Leonardo Carlos Fernández (born 16 March 1972) is an Argentine retired footballer who played as a left back, and is a manager.

Career
Born in Rosario, Santa Fe, Fernández played as a left back during his career. After graduating with Club Renato Cesarini's youth setup, he notably represented River Plate (but only appearing for the reserve side), Central Córdoba, Gimnasia y Tiro, Aldosivi and Tiro Federal. He retired with the latter in 1999.

In 2000, shortly after retiring, Fernández started working as a manager, taking over Club Sportivo Belgrano de Oliveros' youth squads. He was later in charge of Renato Cesarini, Tiro Federal, Atlético Pujato and Coronel Aguirre before joining Rosario Central's youth setup in 2013.

On 16 December 2016, after the dismissal of Eduardo Coudet, Fernández was named interim manager of the first team. His first professional match in charge occurred two days later, a 2–0 win against Belgrano. After the appointment of Paolo Montero, he returned to his previous duties.

On 11 November 2017, Fernández was again interim in the place of Montero. He was definitely appointed manager on 27 December, but resigned the following 28 April.

References

External links

1972 births
Living people
Footballers from Rosario, Santa Fe
Argentine footballers
Association football defenders
Club Atlético River Plate footballers
Central Córdoba de Rosario footballers
Gimnasia y Tiro footballers
Aldosivi footballers
Tiro Federal footballers
Argentine football managers
Argentine Primera División managers
Tiro Federal managers
Rosario Central managers